Sanjay Lathar is an Indian politician. He was Leader of the Opposition in Uttar Pradesh Legislative Council since March 2022 to May 2022, after death of Ahmed Hasan. He is associated with Samajwadi Party. He was Member of the Uttar Pradesh Legislative Council since 2016 to 2022.

Early life 
Lathar was born on July 7, 1971.

References 

Members of the Uttar Pradesh Legislative Council
Samajwadi Party politicians
1971 births
Living people